Mira Verås Larsen (born 17 April 1987, Bærum) is a Norwegian canoe sprinter. She was selected to be Norway's flag-bearer at the 2012 Summer Olympics Parade of Nations.

Personal life
Her great grandfather took the first norwegian olympic gold in 1906 in teams gymnastics. In 2011, she married fellow Olympic kayaker Eirik Verås Larsen.

References 

Canoeists at the 2012 Summer Olympics
Olympic canoeists of Norway
Norwegian female canoeists
1987 births
Living people
Sportspeople from Bærum